Gerald D. Griffin (born December 25, 1934) is an American aeronautical engineer and former NASA official, who served as a flight director during the Apollo program and director of Johnson Space Center, succeeding Chris Kraft in 1982.

When Griffin was nine years old his family moved to Fort Worth, Texas. Upon graduation from Texas A&M he was commissioned as an officer in the United States Air Force. He served four years on active duty, first in flight training, then flying as a weapon systems officer in jet fighter-interceptors. In 1960 Griffin left active duty and began his space career as a systems engineer/flight controller at the USAF Satellite Test Center in Sunnyvale, California.

In 1964 Griffin joined NASA in Houston as a flight controller in Mission Control, specializing in guidance, navigation and control systems during Project Gemini. In 1968 he was named a Mission Control flight director and served in that role for all of the Apollo Program manned missions, including all nine manned missions out to the Moon, six of which included lunar landings. Griffin's "Gold" team conducted half of the lunar landings made during Apollo: Apollos 14, 16, and 17. His team was scheduled to conduct the landing of Apollo 13, but when the landing was cancelled as a result of the oxygen tank explosion, his team played a key role in the safe return of the astronauts.

After the Apollo Program was completed Griffin served in other roles at NASA, first in multiple positions at NASA Headquarters in Washington, D.C., then as the deputy director of the Dryden (now Armstrong) Flight Research Center in California, then as deputy director of the Kennedy Space Center in Florida. In 1982 he returned to Houston as director of the Johnson Space Center.

After taking early retirement from NASA in 1986, Griffin became a senior executive with several non-space, as well as space-related, companies and organizations in the private sector. Today Griffin remains active in several businesses at the senior level. He also is a technical and management consultant for a broad range of clients.

Because of his real-life role as a flight director during the troubled flight of Apollo 13, Griffin was a technical advisor for the 1995 film Apollo 13. Later he was a technical advisor and also acted in the films Contact (1997) and Deep Impact (1998), and was the technical advisor for the 2011 film Apollo 18. He is a member of the Screen Actors Guild. Griffin was played by actor David Clyde Carr in the 1998 HBO miniseries From the Earth to the Moon, .

Griffin is an active general aviation pilot and aircraft owner, holding a commercial license with an instrument rating for single-engine aircraft, multi-engine aircraft and helicopters.

Early life and education
Gerry and his twin brother, Richard L. "Larry" Griffin, were born on December 25, 1934, in Athens, Texas to parents Herschel Hayden Griffin (1903–1989) and Helen Elizabeth Boswell Griffin (1904–1947). The twins also had an older brother, Kenneth H. "Ken" Griffin (1925–2003). The family moved to Fort Worth, Texas in 1944, and Gerry graduated from Arlington Heights High School in 1952. While in high school Gerry continued his activities in the Boy Scouts of America and earned the rank of Eagle Scout in 1951 at the age of 16. In junior high school and high school Gerry also began his long association with the military through the Junior Reserve Officer Training Corps (JROTC), then the Reserve Officer Training Corps (ROTC).

In the fall of 1952 Griffin entered the Agricultural and Mechanical College of Texas, now Texas A&M University, to study aeronautical engineering. He was a member of the famed Texas A&M Corps of Cadets for four years and was commissioned as a second lieutenant in the United States Air Force (USAF) upon graduation in 1956 with a Bachelor of Science degree. After graduation Griffin went to work for Douglas Aircraft Company in Long Beach, California, prior to being called to active duty by the USAF.

Military duty

USAF training

Pre-flight
The USAF ordered Griffin to report for active duty on December 7, 1956, at Lackland Air Force Base in San Antonio, Texas. This was a 30-day "Pre-Flight" period which included physical and psychological exams, orientation courses, drill, physical training, ejection seat training, etc.

Primary-Basic Navigator Course
At the end of pre-flight Griffin was ordered to Harlingen Air Force Base in Harlingen, Texas where he would undergo one year of primary and basic navigation training. This was one year of intense ground school and inflight aircraft training in the Convair T-29. All phases of day and night navigation were covered including dead reckoning, celestial, radio, and radar. In December 1957 Griffin was awarded his USAF Navigator Wings.

Radar Fighter Interceptor Course
Griffin chose the fighter interceptor path in order to eventually be able to fly in high-performance supersonic jet fighters. This advanced training was at James Connally Air Force Base in Waco, Texas and was six months in duration. Again, intense ground school was accompanied by inflight day and night intercept training, first in the North American B-25 Mitchell, then in the Northrop F-89D Scorpion. Griffin finished second in his class and was able to select the operational assignment he wanted: the 84th Fighter Interceptor Squadron (FIS) at Hamilton Air Force Base in Marin County, California.

USAF operations

84th FIS, Hamilton Air Force Base, California
The 84th FIS was a fighter squadron in the USAF Air Defense Command. Griffin arrived at the 84th FIS in June 1958 to serve as a Weapons Systems Officer, flying first in the Northrop F-89J Scorpion, a subsonic air defense fighter, and then in the McDonnell F-101B Voodoo a supersonic air defense fighter. Both aircraft carried two MB-1 Genie nuclear air-to-air missiles with 3.5 kiloton warheads. Both aircraft also carried two Hughes Falcon infrared heat-seeking missiles with high-explosive warheads. In 1960, while still serving in the 84th FIS, Griffin, on his own and in his spare time, began his general aviation career as a pilot by taking flying lessons at a local airport in nearby Novato, California. Griffin served in the 84th FIS for two and a half years before leaving active duty on December 26, 1960, at the rank of first lieutenant. Griffin remained in the USAF Active Reserve until 1964 attaining the rank of captain. He was then assigned to the USAF Inactive Reserve until 1974, when he was retired officially from the USAF Reserve. During four years on active duty and four years in the active reserve Griffin logged over 800 hours of military flight time.

Pre-NASA space career

Lockheed Missile and Space Company (LMSC)
Immediately after leaving USAF active duty Griffin joined LMSC in January 1961 as a Missile Systems Engineer at the USAF Satellite Test Center (STC) in Sunnyvale, California. LMSC was the prime contractor for flight operations in the STC which controlled USAF satellites launched into polar orbit from Vandenberg AFB, California. This was the era of the early reconnaissance (spy) satellites with names such as Discoverer, MIDAS and SAMOS. This was Griffin's first experience as a real-time flight controller during launch, orbit, and entry of space vehicles. He performed systems analysis of the satellites and the Agena upper stage used on the Thor and Atlas launch vehicles. Griffin's primary areas of specialty were guidance, control and propulsion systems.

General Dynamics/Fort Worth (GD/FW)
In 1962 Griffin left LMSC after two years to return to his native Texas and became a Senior Aerosystems Engineer at GD/FW in Fort Worth, Texas. GD/FW, a long-time designer and developer of aircraft, was venturing into space systems studies and, hopefully, space hardware development in the future. Griffin was brought in to help in the space effort, but from the beginning he was involved in research and engineering tasks involving aircraft and spacecraft guidance and control systems for NASA and USAF customers.

From May 5, 1961, the day astronaut Al Shepard rode the Freedom 7 spacecraft in a suborbital flight down the Atlantic Ocean from Cape Canaveral, Griffin's desire was to work at NASA as a flight controller in Mission Control.

NASA career

NASA Manned Spacecraft Center

Project Gemini
In June 1964 Griffin went to work at the Manned Spacecraft Center (renamed Lyndon B. Johnson Space Center in 1973). Project Mercury had recently ended and Project Gemini was just beginning. The USAF Agena was to be used as a rendezvous and docking target for the Gemini, and because of his background with the Agena Griffin was hired as an Agena flight controller. However, the second (and final) unmanned test flight of the Gemini-Titan was about to take place at Cape Canaveral, and Griffin was diverted to become a Gemini flight controller in the position of "GNC": Guidance, Navigation & Control. He served as a GNC flight controller throughout the Gemini program, specializing in guidance, navigation, control and propulsion systems. At the completion of Project Gemini he was preparing for similar role for the Apollo program when the Apollo 1 fire occurred.

Apollo Program

As a result of the Apollo 1 fire the Apollo mission schedule was delayed for 21 months. During the delay Griffin was named an Apollo flight director and served in that role for all of the Apollo Program manned missions. Griffin was lead flight director for three lunar missions: Apollo 12, Apollo 15, and Apollo 17. Griffin's "Gold" team controlled two Earth launches (Apollo 12 and Apollo 15), and half of Apollo's six lunar landings (Apollo's 14, 16, and 17). His team was scheduled to conduct the landing of Apollo 13, but when the landing was canceled as a result of the oxygen tank explosion, his team played a key role in the safe return of the astronauts.

NASA Headquarters

Assistant Administrator for Legislative Affairs
Griffin was responsible for coordinating and orchestrating all NASA liaison activities with Congress. He served as the principal advisor to the Administrator and other NASA officials on matters involving relations with the Congress as well as state and local governments.

Deputy Associate Administrator for Space Flight (Operations)
Griffin was responsible for early Space Transportation Systems (STS) operations planning, the development of user policies, and the establishment of pricing policies. These initial STS operational concepts were incorporated in overall Agency planning for the Shuttle era and became the foundation for later STS operations.

NASA Dryden Flight Research Center

Deputy director
Griffin served as "general manager" of the NASA center responsible for aircraft flight research programs involving a wide variety of aeronautical and space technology. Major efforts involved the flight testing of high-speed aircraft and preparations for the Shuttle Approach and Landing Test Program. In addition to general management functions, his specific duties required a strong interface with USAF flight research/test activities.

NASA Kennedy Space Center

Deputy director
Griffin served as the "general manager" of NASA's center for launch operations for unmanned and manned systems. KSC was a 140,000-acre installation with an original plant value of $1.8 billion, a workforce of 2,200 civil servants and 10,000 support contractors and an annual budget of $550 million. During this period KSC was the launch site for the unmanned Delta and Atlas-Centaur launch vehicles and the April 1981 first launch of the Space Shuttle.

Scott Science & Technology, Inc.

Vice president
Griffin had responsibility for systems engineering and general management functions of the company, a small R&D organization involved in high-technology products manufacturing and testing, research studies, management systems consultation and classified support contact work for the Department of Defense manned space flight activities.

NASA Johnson Space Center

Director
Griffin was responsible for NASA's prime center for manned space flight R&D and operations. The workforce included 3,200 civil servants and 10,000 support contractors. He was responsible for a budget of $1.5 billion per year and a diverse array of unique facilities. Griffin led the successful effort to bring the full Shuttle capability to operational status and played a key role in securing approval for the development of the International Space Station.

Private sector career

Greater Houston Chamber of Commerce

President and CEO
Griffin was responsible for the total operation of the Greater Houston Chamber of Commerce, one of the largest chambers of commerce in the United States. His duties included external and internal functions. External functions included developing and executing a board-approved program of work aimed at regional improvements and economic development. Internal functions included budget planning and control, membership development and staffing.

Korn Ferry International

Managing director, Houston Office
Griffin was responsible for leading and directing the operation of the Houston office of Korn/Ferry International. He conducted searches in a general practice and, on a firm wide basis, specialized in searches for the aerospace, defense and other technology intensive industries.

Comarco, Inc

Chairman of the board
Griffin joined the board of Comarco as a director in April 1986 and, in August 1988, was named chairman of the board. Comarco was a publicly owned company traded on the NASDAQ exchange and had sales of approximately $55 million per year. Comarco was a leading provider of advanced technology tools and engineering services to the wireless communications industry. Comarco also designed and manufactured mobile power products for wireless devices.

Korn Ferry International

Senior consultant
As a senior consultant with Korn/Ferry International, Griffin assists the firm in recruiting assignments for senior-level executives, especially for clients in technology-intensive industries and organizations. He is the former managing director of Korn/Ferry's Houston office.

GDG Consulting

Owner and principal
Griffin currently provides technical and management consulting services for a broad range of clients.

KLG Contracting, Inc

Owner and president
KLG Contracting, Inc., an S-corporation, provides general contracting, site preparation, and construction services for private home and other building projects.

Golden Spike Company

Chairman of the board
Griffin is chairman of the board of the Golden Spike Company (GSC), a Delaware Corporation headquartered in Boulder, Colorado. GSC is early-stage commercial space company whose long-term goal is to develop and operate capabilities in space infrastructure for travel and exploration in and beyond low Earth orbit.

Motion picture and other media activities

Motion pictures
 1995 Apollo 13 (Technical Consultant)
 1997 Contact (Technical Consultant and actor) 
 1998 Deep Impact (Technical Advisor and actor)
 2011 Apollo 18 (Technical Advisor/Consultant)

Other media
 1986 Today on January 29, 1986 (TV Series)
 1994 Houston, We've Got a Problem (documentary short)
 1995 Apollo 13: For the Record (documentary)
 1996 Lost Moon: The Triumph of Apollo 13 (video documentary)
 2003 Failure Is Not an Option (TV Movie documentary)
 2005 Beyond the Moon: Failure Is Not an Option 2 (TV movie documentary)
 2017 Mission Control: The Unsung Heroes of Apollo (Movie/Video documentary)

General aviation

Pilot courses completed

 Private Pilot Course, FAA, 1964
 Commercial Pilot Course, FAA, 1971
 Instrument Pilot Course, FAA, 1971
 Multi Engine Pilot Course, FAA, 1971
 Helicopter Pilot Course, FAA, 1974

Certificate and ratings held

Commercial Pilot
 Airplane Single and Multi Engine Land
 Instrument Airplane
 Rotorcraft-Helicopter

National Aeronautic Association and Federation Aeronautique Internationale records

 World Speed Record, Houston to Denver, Aircraft Class C-1b, PA-18A Super Cub N1937G, 7:45:47, May 30, 1987
 Larry Griffin, Pilot
 Gerry Griffin, Pilot
 World Speed Record, Houston to Dallas, Aircraft Class C-1b, PA-18A Super Cub N1937G, 1:59:52, May 17, 1991
 Gerry Griffin, Pilot
 Larry Griffin, Pilot

PA-18A Super Cub N1937G
N1937G was originally manufactured in 1959 and used periodically as a crop duster. The aircraft was purchased by Larry and Gerry Griffin in 1985. They had the aircraft completely rebuilt including the installation of a modified Lycoming O-360 engine which produces 200 horsepower, a constant speed propeller, and long range fuel tanks. The reconstruction was completed in 1989.

Current affiliations
 Trustee, Schreiner University, Kerrville, Texas
 Ambassador and past chair, 12th Man Foundation, Texas A&M University 
 Member, board of advisors, Rotary National Award for Space Achievement Foundation
 Director, NASA Alumni League, Washington, DC
 Founding member, Texas Coalition for Excellence in Higher Education
 Member, advisory board, Texas A&M Engineering Experiment Station (TEES)
 Member, technology advisory board, Runway Capital Partners
 Member, board of advisors, AlphaSpace LLC, Houston, Texas

Past affiliations
 Founding director and organizer, Bank of the Hills, Kerrville, Texas
 Member, board of advisors, Coalition for Space Exploration
 Member, board of advisors, MEI Technologies, Inc., Houston, Texas
 Member, Council for Continuous Improvement and Innovation in Texas Higher Education
 Director, Comarco, Incorporated, Lake Forest, California
 Advisor, Astrolabe Ventures, Palo Alto, California
 Trustee, Universities Space Research Association, Columbia, Maryland
 Member, Texas Higher Education Coordinating Board, Austin, Texas
 Member, Upper Guadalupe River Authority, Kerrville, Texas
 Board of Advisors, COM-NET Ericsson, Incorporated, Lynchburg, Virginia
 Commissioner, Texas National Research Laboratory Commission
 Commissioner, Texas Space Science Industry Commission
 Member, Space Research and Technology Advisory Board, Texas A&M University
 Member, executive advisory board, College of Business Administration, University of Houston
 Member, development board, University of Houston System
 Member, Institutional Advancement Council, University of Houston-Downtown
 Member, International Academy of Astronautics 
 Member, executive committee, Wings Over Houston Airshow
 President, The 12th Man Foundation, Texas A&M University
 Director, Texas A&M University Corps of Cadets Development Council Board
 Member, Corps of Cadets Development Council, Texas A&M University
 Director, General Space Corporation, Pittsburgh, Pennsylvania
 Senior fellow, Eaker Institute of Aerospace Studies
 Advisory director, ECI Building Components, Inc., Houston, Texas
 Director, NCNB Texas, Nassau Bay Bank, Houston, Texas
 Director, American Chamber of Commerce Executives, Arlington, Virginia
 Director (Ex-Officio), Texas Medical Center, Houston, Texas
 Director, Greater Houston Community Foundation, Houston, Texas
 Director, Central Houston, Inc
 Governor, The Forum Club of Houston
 Director, Houston Business Council, Inc
 Director, Houston World Trade Association
 Director, Houston International Protocol Alliance
 Director, Business Volunteers for the Arts
 Director, Institute of International Education, Houston, Texas
 Director, Sisters of Charity of the Incarnate Word Hospitals, Houston, Texas
 Director, The Space Foundation, Houston, Texas
 Director, Hill Country Arts Foundation
 Director, Challenger Center for Space Science Education, Washington, DC
 Trustee, Challenger Benefit Fund, Houston, Texas
 Director, executive board, Sam Houston Area Council, Boy Scouts of America, Houston, Texas
 Director, YMCA of the Greater Houston Area, Houston, Texas

Honors and awards
 Presidential Medal of Freedom, The Apollo XIII Mission Operations Team, 1970
 Exceptional Service Medal, NASA, 1970
 Exceptional Service Medal, NASA, 1971
 Creative Management Award, NASA, 1974
 Old Master Award, Purdue University, 1978
 Eminent Engineer, Tau Beta Pi, 1979
 Meritorious Senior Executive, Presidential Rank, 1980
 Outstanding Leadership Medal, NASA, 1981
 Alumni Honor Award, College of Engineering, Texas A&M University, 1983
 Honorary Doctor of Humane Letters, University of Houston Clear Lake, 1984
 Distinguished Senior Executive, Presidential Rank, NASA, 1985
 Distinguished Alumnus, Texas A&M University, 1985
 Distinguished Service Medal, NASA, 1986
 Distinguished Leadership Award, School of Business and Public Administration, University of Houston Clear Lake, 1986
 Houston Outstanding Aggie, 1987
 Texas A&M Muster Speaker, Main Campus, Texas A&M University, 1988
 Manager of the Year, National Management Association, Gulf Coast Council, 1988
 Corps of Cadets Hall of Honor, Texas A&M University, 1996
 Member, International Air & Space Hall of Fame, San Diego Air & Space Museum, 2013
 Distinguished Alumnus, Aerospace Engineering Department, Texas A&M University, 2014
 Namesake, Texas A&M University Fish Camp, Texas A&M University, 2014
 Apollo Celebration Pioneer Award, 2018

Professional organizations
 Fellow, American Institute of Aeronautics and Astronautics
 Fellow, American Astronautical Society
 Member, Experimental Aircraft Association
 Member, National Aeronautic Association
 Member, Aircraft Owners and Pilots Association
 Member, Screen Actors Guild

Publications
 Gerald D. Griffin, chairman, Report on "White House Study on Government Procurement Practices for Research and Development Activities", 1979
 Gerald D. Griffin, "Commercial Use of Space – The Space Business Era", U.S. Space Technology Conference, Zurich, Switzerland, June 19–21, 1984.
 G.D. Griffin, "Mechanical Engineering Aspects of the Space Shuttle Orbiter – Design, Manufacture and Operation", Institution of Mechanical Engineers, London, England, September 13, 1984.
 G.D. Griffin, "Contractors and Government: Teamwork and Commitment", NASA Symposium on Productivity and Quality, Washington, DC, September 25–26, 1984
 Gerald D. Griffin, "Space Commercialization and Industry", United States Space Foundation 1st Annual Space Symposium, Colorado Springs, Colorado, November 26–28, 1984.
 Gerald D. Griffin, "Industry Opportunities in the Space Station Era", Canadian Space Business Opportunities Conference, Toronto, Canada, April 24–25, 1985.
 Gerald D. Griffin, "NASA and the Department of Defense in Space", Air Force War College, Maxwell Air Force Base, Alabama, May 7, 1985.
 Gerald D. Griffin, "Current Status and Future Evolution of the Space Transportation System", Subcommittee on Space Science and Applications, Committee on Science and Technology, U.S. House of Representatives, Washington, DC, June 1985.
 Gerald D. Griffin, "Challenges for the NASA/Contractor/University Team", Conference on R&D Productivity: New Challenges for the U.S. Space Program, Houston, Texas, September 10–11, 1985.
 Gerald D. Griffin, "The Shuttle – The Space Station – And Beyond", AIAA Shuttle Environment and Operations II Conference, Houston, Texas November 13–15, 1985.
 Gerry Griffin, "New Technology = New Business", Business Forum, Abilene Christian University, Abilene, Texas, April 9, 1986
 Gerald D. Griffin, "Space – Where are We Going?", Armed Forces Communications and Electronics Association Symposium on Space Command, Control and Communications (C3), Colorado Springs, Colorado, August 6, 1986.
 Gerry Griffin, "Building Commercial Space Industries", Conference on Commercial Opportunities from Space Transport & Related Industries, Brisbane, Australia, April 26–28, 1988.
 Gerald D. Griffin, "Improving the Business Climate – Space Technology as an Engine of Economic Growth", Arizona Looks to the Future: Space, Technology and the Economy Conference, Tucson, Arizona, October 23, 1989.
 Gerry Griffin, "The Apollo Missions – A Perspective of Then & Now", Young Pharmacists Group 10th Annual Conference, Birmingham, England, October 20–22, 1995.
 Gerry Griffin, "NASA's Most Important Asset – Its People", NASA Alumni League News, Vol. 7, No. 2, Winter 1996.
 Gerry Griffin, "Space and e-Business: Both Full of Challenges", British Telecom Europe Annual Conference, Barcelona, Spain, January 27, 2000.
 Gerry Griffin, "Getting the Difficult Job Done", DaimlerChrysler Project Management Conference, Lansing, Michigan, June 2, 2003.
 Gerry Griffin, "The Foundations and Operating Principles of Mission Control: A Roadmap to Success", Banca Mediolanum Annual Convention, Rimini, Italy, March 4, 2005.
 Gerry Griffin, "A Key Step for America: Ares 1-X Flight a New Chapter in Human Spaceflight", Op-Ed, Florida Today, November 7, 2009.
 Gerry Griffin, "Situational Awareness in Human Space Flight-Lessons Learned", Bombardier Safety Standdown, Wichita, Kansas, October 6, 2010.
 Gerry Griffin, "Crew-Ground Integration in Piloted Space Programs", HCI-Aero 2010 Conference, Cape Canaveral, Florida, November 3, 2010.
 Gerry Griffin, "U.S. Mustn't Give Up on Space", Op-Ed, USA Today, April 5, 2011
 Gerald D. Griffin, "Testimony before the Joint Legislative Committee on Oversight of Higher Education, Governance & Transparency", Texas Legislature, Austin, Texas, September 21, 2011
 Gerry Griffin & S. Alan Stern, "U.S. Needs Near-term Results in Human Space Exploration", Op-Ed, Space News, September 24, 2011

References

External links
 Gerald D. Griffin NASA profile
 Johnson Space Center Directors
 Interview for Apollo 18 film.

1934 births
American aerospace engineers
Living people
NASA flight controllers
People from Athens, Texas
Presidential Medal of Freedom recipients
Texas A&M University alumni
Commercial aviators
Engineers from Texas